Janikowo  is a village in the administrative district of Gmina Swarzędz, within Poznań County, Greater Poland Voivodeship, in west-central Poland. The village lies on Poznań's city boundary; a neighbourhood also known as Janikowo is within that boundary, slightly to the south-west of the village.

The village of Janikowo has a population of 474.

References

Janikowo
Janikowo